Garmab (also Romanized as Garmāb and Garm Āb) is a village in Kanduleh Rural District, Dinavar District, Sahneh County, Kermanshah Province, Iran. At the 2006 census, its population was 116, in 24 families.

References 

Populated places in Sahneh County